T6 was a sea-going torpedo boat that was operated by the Royal Yugoslav Navy between 1921 and 1941, after spending World War I in Austro-Hungarian Navy service. Originally 93 F, she was a 250t-class torpedo boat built in 1915–1916. She saw active service during World War I, performing  convoy, escort, patrol and minesweeping tasks, and anti-submarine operations. Following Austria-Hungary's defeat in 1918, 93 F was allocated to the Navy of the Kingdom of Serbs, Croats and Slovenes, which later became the Royal Yugoslav Navy, and was renamed T6. At the time, she and the seven other 250t-class boats were the only modern sea-going vessels of the fledgling maritime force.

During the interwar period, T6 and the rest of the navy were involved in training exercises and cruises to friendly ports, but activity was limited by reduced naval budgets. The ship was captured by the Italians during the German-led Axis invasion of Yugoslavia in April 1941. After her main armament was modernised, she served with the Royal Italian Navy under her Yugoslav designation, conducting coastal and second-line escort duties in the Adriatic. Following the Italian capitulation in September 1943, she was scuttled by her crew as she had insufficient fuel on board to reach an Allied port.

Background
In 1910, the Austria-Hungary Naval Technical Committee initiated the design and development of a  coastal torpedo boat, specifying that it should be capable of sustaining  for 10 hours. This specification was based an expectation that the Strait of Otranto, where the Adriatic Sea meets the Ionian Sea, would be blockaded by hostile forces during a future conflict. In such circumstances, there would be a need for a torpedo boat that could still sail from the Austro-Hungarian Navy base at the Bocche di Cattaro (Bay of Kotor) to the Strait during the night, locate and attack blockading ships and return to port before morning. Steam turbine power was selected for propulsion, as diesels with the necessary power were not available, and the Austro-Hungarian Navy did not have the practical experience to run turbo-electric boats. Stabilimento Tecnico Triestino (STT) of Trieste was selected for the contract to build the first eight vessels, designated as the T-group. Another tender was requested for four more boats, but when Ganz & Danubius reduced their price by ten per cent, a total of sixteen boats were ordered from them, designated the F-group. The F-group designation signified the location of Ganz & Danubius' main shipyard at Fiume. 93 F was the seventh boat of the F-group to be fully completed.

Description and construction
The crew consisted of 38–41 officers and enlisted men. The boats were powered by two AEG-Curtiss steam turbines driving two propellers, using steam generated by two Yarrow water-tube boilers, one of which burned fuel oil and the other coal. The F-group had two funnels rather than the single funnel of the preceding T-group. Due to inadequate funding for a more robust design, 96 F and the rest of the 250t class were essentially coastal vessels, despite the original intention that they would be used for "high seas" operations. The 250t-class were the first small Austro-Hungarian Navy boats to use turbines, and this contributed to ongoing problems with them.

The boats were armed with two Škoda  L/30 guns, and four  torpedo tubes. They could also carry 10–12 naval mines. Laid down on 9 January 1915, 93 F was launched on 25 November 1915 and completed on 16 April 1916.

Career

World War I and interwar period
During World War I, 93 F was used for convoy, patrol, escort and minesweeping tasks, and anti-submarine operations. On 3 May 1916, 93 F and five other 250-class torpedo boats were accompanying four destroyers when they were involved in a surface action off Porto Corsini against an Italian force led by the flotilla leaders Cesare Rossarol and Guglielmo Pepe. On this occasion the Austro-Hungarian force retreated behind a minefield with no damage to the torpedo boats, and only splinter damage to one of the destroyers. In 1917, one of her 66 mm guns was placed on an anti-aircraft mount. On 3 June, the destroyers  and Csikós, along with 93 F and another 250t-class boat, had a brief encounter with three Italian MAS boats off the mouth of the Tagliamento River in the far north of the Adriatic. The boat survived the war intact.

In 1920, under the terms of the previous year's Treaty of Saint-Germain-en-Laye by which rump Austria officially ended World War I, 93 F was allocated to the Kingdom of Serbs, Croats and Slovenes (KSCS, later Yugoslavia). Along with three other 250t-class F-group boats, 87 F, 96 F and 97 F, and four 250t-class T-group boats, she served with the Royal Yugoslav Navy (KJRM). Taken over in March 1921, in KJRM service, 93 F was renamed T6. When the navy was formed, she and the other seven 250t-class boats were the only modern sea-going vessels in the KJRM. In 1925, exercises were conducted off the Dalmatian coast, involving the majority of the navy. It is not clear if T6 was one of the torpedo boats involved. The ships and crews made a very good impression on the British while visiting Malta. In 1932, the British naval attaché reported that Yugoslav ships engaged in few exercises, manoeuvres or gunnery training due to reduced budgets.

World War II
In April 1941, Yugoslavia entered World War II when it was invaded by the German-led Axis powers. At the time of the invasion, T6 was assigned to the 3rd Torpedo Division located at Šibenik, which included her three former F-group sisters. On 8 April, the four boats of the 3rd Torpedo Division, along with other vessels, were tasked to support an attack on the Italian enclave of Zara on the Dalmatian coast. They were subjected to three Italian air attacks and, after the last one, sailed from the area of Zaton into Lake Prokljan, where they remained until 11 April. On 12 April, the 3rd Torpedo Division arrived at Milna on the island of Brač, and refused to follow orders to sail to the Bay of Kotor. All four F-group boats were then captured by the Italians.

T6 was then operated by the Italians under her Yugoslav designation, conducting coastal and second-line escort duties in the Adriatic. Her guns were replaced by two  L/40 anti-aircraft guns, but no other significant alterations were made to her.

See also
List of ships of the Royal Yugoslav Navy

Notes

Footnotes

References

 
 
 
 
 
 
 
 
 
 
 
 
 
 

Ships built in Fiume
Torpedo boats of the Austro-Hungarian Navy
World War I torpedo boats of Austria-Hungary
Ships of the Royal Yugoslav Navy
Naval ships of Yugoslavia captured by Italy during World War II
1916 ships
Torpedo boats of the Royal Yugoslav Navy